The women's long jump event at the 1967 Pan American Games was held in Winnipeg on 2 August.

Results

References

Athletics at the 1967 Pan American Games
1967